Liam Hurst (born 2 September 1994) is an English footballer who plays for  side Shepshed Dynamo, where he plays as a forward.

Playing career

Cambridge United
Hurst left Cambridge United in May 2015 having made six league appearances.

Statistics

References

External links

1994 births
Living people
English footballers
Association football forwards
Cambridge United F.C. players
Cambridge City F.C. players
Corby Town F.C. players
St Neots Town F.C. players
King's Lynn Town F.C. players
Coalville Town F.C. players
Shepshed Dynamo F.C. players
National League (English football) players
English Football League players